Lake Kununurra is a freshwater man-made reservoir located in the Ord River valley. The lake was formed in 1963 by the construction of the Ord Diversion Dam in Kununurra, northern Western Australia, which was built to supply water to the Ord River Irrigation Area. Prior to the diversion dam construction a natural permanent waterhole (or lake) held back by the Bandicoot Bar was known as "Carlton Reach", which was reputed to be the largest waterhole in the Kimberley.

Description
At the town of Kununurra the lake is connected to Lily Creek Lagoon. It contains freshwater crocodiles and 21 fish species, and is widely used for recreational fishing and boating by the residents of Kununurra and tourists. Because of the stable water levels in Lake Kununurra and its associated wetlands, it has well-developed fringing vegetation of grassland, rushes and woodland. The wetland system of the two lakes and the lagoon forms the Lakes Argyle and Kununurra Ramsar Site.
Local rangers lay baits in hopes of catching the creature.

Birds
The lake forms part of the Ord Irrigation Area Important Bird Area (IBA), so identified by BirdLife International because of its importance for wild birds, especially estrildid finches.

Engineering heritage award 
The diversion dam was declared a Historic Landmark of Agricultural Engineering and awarded an Engineering Heritage Marker by Engineers Australia as part of its Engineering Heritage Recognition Program.

See also

 List of reservoirs and dams in Western Australia
 Water security in Australia

References

External links
 Lakes Argyle and Kununurra Ramsar Site – map
Kununurra Historical Society Inc. Archive, Library, Museum & Research (Links to Archive Images of Lake Kununurra)

Ramsar sites in Australia
Important Bird Areas of Western Australia
Kununurra
Infrastructure completed in 1963
Ord River
Kununurra, Western Australia